Alfred Herbert may refer to:

Alfred Herbert, industrialist
Alfred Herbert Limited
Alfred Herbert (painter)
Xavier Herbert, Australian author also referred to as Alfred Francis Xavier Herbert